= Arizona School for the Deaf and Blind =

School in Tucson, Arizona, United States

Coordinates: 32.2370°N 110.9904°W

The Arizona School for the Deaf and Blind (ASDB) in a school in Tucson, Arizona, whose history dates back to Arizona's own statehood in 1912 when it enrolled 19 students on the campus of the University of Arizona in October of that year. As of 2023, it educated more than two thousand students in its locations in Tucson and Phoenix and via services it provided to other public school students. This figure represented about 85% of the state's blind and/or deaf school age population.

In January 2026, the school announced a move to a former Tucson elementary school as a means of cutting costs following funding challenges dating back to 2023, but it was unclear whether all students would be served at the new location.

== Facilities ==
The school's Berger Performing Arts Center, formally the Edward B. Berger Performing Arts Center is the longtime home of the Saguaro City Music Theatre. The Berger is slated to close on June 30, 2026, due to a lack of funding and the school's relocation.

The performing arts center is named for Edward Berger, who moved to Tucson to attend the school and graduated as valedictorian.
